Statistics of National Association Foot Ball League in season 1911–12.

League standings
                          GP   W   L   T   Pts
 West Hudson A.A.          13   9   2   2    20
 Paterson Wilberforce      12   6   2   4   16
 Paterson True Blues       11   5   3   3   13
 Paterson Rangers          12   5   4   3   13
 Jersey A.C.               14   4   6   3   11
 Brooklyn F.C.             11   4   5   2   10
 Bronx United              11   2   5   4    8
 Kearny Scots              12   2   9   1    5

References
NATIONAL ASSOCIATION FOOT BALL LEAGUE (RSSSF)

1911-12
1911–12 domestic association football leagues
1911–12 in American soccer